Leslie Adams (birth registered fourth ¼ 1909 – 31 January 1945), also known by the nickname of "Juicy", was an English professional rugby league footballer who played in the 1930s and 1940s.

Background
Les 'Juicy' Adams' birth was registered in Leeds district, West Riding of Yorkshire, England, and he died aged 35 in Burma.

Playing career

International honours
Adams won caps for England while at Leeds in 1931 against Wales, while at Castleford in 1936 against Wales, in 1939 against France, and won a cap for Great Britain while at Leeds on Saturday 18 June 1932 against Australia at Brisbane Cricket Ground (the Gabba).

County honours
He won caps playing  for Yorkshire while at Castleford in the 0–10 defeat by Cumberland at Whitehaven's stadium on 29 September 1934, the 5–5 draw with Lancashire at Leeds' stadium on 9 January 35, the 16–5 victory over Lancashire at Widnes' stadium on 12 October 1935, the 16–10 victory over Cumberland at Workington Town's stadium on 10 October 1936, the 6–28 defeat by Lancashire at Castleford's stadium on 21 October 1936, and the 7–7 draw with Cumberland at Hunslet's stadium on 10 November 1937.

Challenge Cup Final appearances
He played  in Leeds' 11–8 victory over Swinton in the 1931–32 Challenge Cup Final during the 1931–32 season at Central Park, Wigan on Saturday 7 May 1932, played  in Huddersfield's 21–17 victory over Warrington in the 1932–33 Challenge Cup Final during the 1932–33 season at Wembley Stadium, London on Saturday 6 May 1933, and played , and scored a try in Castleford's 11–8 victory over Huddersfield in the 1934–35 Challenge Cup Final during the 1934–35 season at Wembley Stadium, London on Saturday 4 May 1935, in front of a crowd of 39,000, In doing so, he became the first player to win the Challenge Cup with three different clubs.

County League appearances
Adams played in Castleford's victories in the Yorkshire County League during the 1932–33 season and 1938–39 season.

Club career
He made his début for Leeds against Featherstone Rovers at Headingley Rugby Stadium, Leeds on 26 March 1927. His transfer from Huddersfield to Castleford on 18 January 1934, for a reported fee of £500, came at his own request.

Genealogical information
Leslie Adams' marriage to Gladys (née Collinson) was registered in June 1934 in Leeds North district. They had children; June M. Adams, born in March 1937 and registered in Leeds North district. Adams was the uncle of the rugby league footballer who played in the 1960s for Leeds and Bramley, Philip Adams (born ).

Death
Adams became a landlord in Leeds, and subsequently volunteered for war duty with the Royal Air Force, becoming a rear gunner with the rank of flight sergeant. He was killed in action on 31 January 1945 while serving as an air gunner on an aerial reconnaissance operation during the Burma campaign. Of the nine men on the plane, three of the occupants, including Adams, are believed to have trapped in the back of the plane, causing them to be killed in the crash. The remaining six men were captured, the 2 officers were separated from the Flight Sergeants and sent to Rangoon Jail, where they survived. The Flight Sergeants, including Stan Woodbridge, later awarded the George Cross, were beheaded by the Japanese Military on 7 February 1945, and are buried in the Taukkyan War Cemetery. After the war the Japanese military officers responsible for the execution were tried for war crimes, and were subsequently executed. Despite numerous searches of the area around the crash site, and discussions with villagers who found the plane, no trace of the body of Adams, or his colleagues, was found.

Honoured at Castleford Tigers
Adams is a Tigers Hall of Fame Inductee.

References

External links
Les 'Juicy' Adams – RAF rear gunner
Final replay evokes emotional feelings
Leslie Adams Memory Box Search at archive.castigersheritage.com
Les Adams Memory Box Search at archive.castigersheritage.com
Juicy Adams Memory Box Search at archive.castigersheritage.com

1909 births
1945 deaths
Military personnel from Leeds
Aviators killed by being shot down
Royal Air Force personnel killed in World War II
Castleford Tigers players
England national rugby league team players
English rugby league players
Great Britain national rugby league team players
Huddersfield Giants players
Leeds Rhinos players
Royal Air Force airmen
Royal Air Force Volunteer Reserve personnel of World War II
Rugby league halfbacks
Rugby league players from Leeds
Yorkshire rugby league team players